

References